Nugzari Mshvenieradze (born 25 June 1952) was a Soviet water polo player. He competed in the men's tournament at the 1976 Summer Olympics.

See also
 List of World Aquatics Championships medalists in water polo

References

External links
 

1952 births
Living people
Soviet male water polo players
Olympic water polo players of the Soviet Union
Water polo players at the 1976 Summer Olympics
Sportspeople from Moscow